Paracrostoma is a genus of Southeast Asian freshwater snails, gastropod molluscs in the  taxonomic family Pachychilidae.

Species
 Paracrostoma huegelii (Philippi, 1843)
 Paracrostoma martini Köhler & Glaubrecht, 2007
 Paracrostoma tigrina Köhler & Glaubrecht, 2007
Species inquirendum
 Paracrostoma huberi Thach, 2018 
Synonyms
 Paracrostoma morrisoni Brandt, 1974: synonym of Brotia armata Brandt, 1968 (junior synonym)
 Paracrostoma paludiformis Solem, 1966: synonym of Brotia paludiformis (Solem, 1966)
 Paracrostoma pseudosulcospira (Brandt, 1968): synonym of Brotia pseudosulcospira Brandt, 1968
 Paracrostoma solemiana (Brandt, 1968): synonym of Brotia solemiana Brandt, 1968

References

External links
 Cossmann, M. (1900) Rectifications de nomenclature. Revue Critique de Paléozoologie, 4: 42–46
 Köhler F. & Glaubrecht M. (2007) Out of Asia and into India: on the molecular phylogeny and biogeography of the endemic freshwater gastropod Paracrostoma Cossmann, 1900 (Caenogastropoda: Pachychilidae). Biological Journal of the Linnean Society 91: 627–651
 Köhler, F.; Dames, C. (2009). Phylogeny and systematics of the Pachychilidae of mainland South-East Asia – novel insights from morphology and mitochondrial DNA (Mollusca, Caenogastropoda, Cerithioidea). Zoological Journal of the Linnean Society. 157, 679–699.

Pachychilidae
Gastropod genera